The Asian-African-Latin American Table Tennis Invitational Tournament (formerly named Asian-African Table Tennis Invitational Tournament in 1971, renamed Asian-African-Latin American Table Tennis Invitational Tournament since 1973) were five table tennis tournaments held in 1971, 73, 75, 76 and 80.

Winners

References 
https://home.kaiqiu.cc/home/space-335067-do-blog-id-159121.html 
https://home.kaiqiu.cc/home/space-335067-do-blog-id-159400.html 
https://home.kaiqiu.cc/home/space-335067-do-blog-id-159368.html 
https://home.kaiqiu.cc/home/space-335067-do-blog-id-159358.html 
https://home.kaiqiu.cc/home/space-335067-do-blog-id-159316.html 

Table tennis competitions in China